The August Wilson House is an historic home which is located in Pittsburgh, Pennsylvania. It once belonged to the family of the famed African-American playwright August Wilson; it was Wilson's childhood home for the first twelve years of his life.

History and architectural features
Located at 1727 Bedford Avenue in the Crawford-Roberts neighborhood, this historic structure was built during the 1840s. It was placed on the List of City of Pittsburgh historic designations on February 26, 2008 and listed on the National Register of Historic Places on April 30, 2013.

The House was opened as an arts center in August 2022.

References

City of Pittsburgh historic designations
Houses completed in the 19th century
Houses in Pittsburgh
Houses on the National Register of Historic Places in Pennsylvania
National Register of Historic Places in Pittsburgh
1840s establishments in Pennsylvania